The Bayley Avenue Historic District is located in Platteville, Wisconsin. It was added to the National Register of Historic Places in 2007.

History
The land that the district is now located on was once owned by John H. Rountree, the founder of Platteville. Contributing buildings in the district were constructed from 1853 to 1940.

References

Houses on the National Register of Historic Places in Wisconsin
Geography of Grant County, Wisconsin
Houses in Grant County, Wisconsin
National Register of Historic Places in Grant County, Wisconsin